Shakil Patel is a Loma Linda, California-based architect known for his work designing mosques for Muslim congregations in California.

Early life 
A British Indian, Patel was born in Blackburn, UK. He moved to Oxford in 2015, choosing the town because, as a religious Muslim, he does not drink alcoholic beverages, and was attracted by the fact that Oxford, which was founded by Seventh-day Adventists, was legally dry. Patel served a 10-year term as City Planning Commissioner, consistently voting against lifting the ban on selling alcohol. He is a member of the Board of Directors.

Career 
Patel is known for designing mosques that fit into the California landscape by combining elements of California's Spanish colonial style with traditional Islamic features such as minarets and/or tower and pointed arches.

Patel's buildings include the Islamic Center of Riverside, the Islamic Center of the South Bay, and the Ontario, California masjid.

References 

Indian emigrants to the United States
American Muslims
21st-century American architects
Living people
People from Loma Linda, California
American people of Indian descent
American businesspeople
Year of birth missing (living people)